Tydal is a municipality in Trøndelag county, Norway. The administrative centre of the municipality is the village of Ås. Other villages include Østby, Gressli, Aunet, and Stugudalen. There is a school and a kindergarten in Tydal.

The inhabitants of Tydal earn a living in farming, forestry, energy production, and tourism. During Easter, the number of people in Tydal increases by up to 5,000 people. Many people from Trondheim celebrate their holidays in the 1,400 cabins located throughout the municipality of Tydal.

The  municipality is the 75th largest by area out of the 356 municipalities in Norway. Tydal is the 346th most populous municipality in Norway with a population of 750.

General information
The municipality of Tydal was established on 1 January 1901 when it was separated from the large municipality of Selbu. The initial population of Tydal was 881. The municipal borders have not changed since that time.  On 1 January 2018, the municipality switched from the old Sør-Trøndelag county to the newly created Trøndelag county.

Name
The municipality (originally the parish) is named after the Tydalen valley since the first Tydal Church was built there. The meaning of the river name is unknown. The name was historically spelled Thidalen or Tydalen.

Coat of arms
The coat of arms was granted on 7 February 1997. The official blazon is "Gules, three St. Anthony's crosses in bend Or". This means the arms have a red field (background) and the charge is three St. Anthony's crosses lined up diagonally. The cross design has a tincture of Or which means it is commonly colored yellow, but if it is made out of metal, then gold is used. This design was chosen to represent a power line and the letter T, representing the name of the municipality and the importance of hydroelectric power generation in Tydal. The arms were designed by Einar Skjervold. The municipal flag has the same design as the coat of arms.

Churches
The Church of Norway has one parish within the municipality of Tydal. It is part of the Stjørdal prosti (deanery) in the Diocese of Nidaros.

Geography

The rivers Tya River and Nea River (together forming the Nea-Nidelvvassdraget watershed) flow through Tydal on their way towards Trondheimsfjorden.

In the southwest, the lake Nesjøen lies just west of the Sylan mountain range with the mountain Storsylen. In the north, the Skarvan and Roltdalen National Park is home to the mountain Fongen.

Government
All municipalities in Norway, including Tydal, are responsible for primary education (through 10th grade), outpatient health services, senior citizen services, unemployment and other social services, zoning, economic development, and municipal roads. The municipality is governed by a municipal council of elected representatives, which in turn elect a mayor.  The municipality falls under the Trøndelag District Court and the Frostating Court of Appeal.

Municipal council
The municipal council of Tydal is made up of 17 representatives that are elected to four year terms. The party breakdown of the council is as follows:

Mayors
The mayors of Tydal:

1901–1907: Nils P. Svelmo (LL)
1908–1919: Olaus Aune (LL)
1920–1931: Jon Næsvold (V)
1932–1934: Bardo Kristian Rolseth (V)
1935–1937: Iver Unsgård (Ap)
1938–1940: Mikal L. Uglem (Ap)
1946–1947: Olav Svelmoe (Ap)
1948–1958: Iver Unsgård (Ap)
1959–1967: Ola Gullbrekken (Ap)
1967-1967: Olaus Østby (Ap)
1968-1968: Hilmar Østby (Ap)
1968–1971: Joralf Østby (Ap)
1972–1987: Peder Kristian Aune (Ap)
1988–1999: Erling Lyngen (LL)
1999–2007: Rolf Almåsbakk (Ap)
2007-2007: Anne-Karin Brandsfjell (Ap)
2007-2011: Kari Slungård (V)
2011-2015: John Paulsby (V)
2015-2019: Ole Bjarne Østby (Sp)
2019–present: Jens Arne Kvello (Sp)

Transportation
Tydal is halfway between the town of Røros and the city of Trondheim, with Norwegian national road 705 as the most important road through Tydal. Trondheim Airport, Værnes is one hour of driving away. There are daily bus connections to Trondheim, Værnes as well as to Røros.

Notable people 
 Iver Johan Unsgård (1903 in Tydal – 1993) a Norwegian politician, three times Mayor of Tydal 1945-1958

References

External links

Municipal fact sheet from Statistics Norway 

 
Municipalities of Trøndelag
1901 establishments in Norway